is Japanese singer Ringo Sheena's 6th single and it was released on March 27, 2001 by Toshiba EMI / Virgin Music.

Background 
In this single, Sheena canceled her partnership with Seiji Kameda, with whom she had arranged her songs up to that point, and asked musicians of various genres to arrange her songs. She arranged three songs in a "night, daytime, and a morning" order, according to the title, and she showed the reading of these song titles by writing katakana.

All players of each song were named "- Paradise Orchestra" on "Mayonaka wa Junketsu" which is the title tune of this single.

Sheena intended to record "Mayonaka wa Junketsu" and "Aisaika no Chōshoku" on the third album Kalk Samen Kuri no Hana.
However, she judged that they weren’t suitable for the view of the world of the album while she was producing that, and she shelved the adoption of the two songs for the album.

The literal translation of song titles is slightly different from the official English title.

The song was covered by Mino Kabasawa on her piano cover album Piano Pure: Memory of 2001, by Rieko Miura, Atsuko Kurusu and Saki Kamiryo on the NTV variety show The Yoru mo Hippare: Aki no Special on September 22, 2001 and by Max on the NTV variety show The Seiya mo Hippare: 2001 Christmas Special on December 15, 2001.

Music video 
"Mayonaka wa Junketsu" was accompanied by an animated music video. Originally, the music video was filmed by live action. The story was that a mysterious woman fights with a baldheaded leader of an evil secret society. Sheena played the woman and Masato Minagawa, a keyboard player of her band, played the enemy's leader.

However, Sheena's pregnancy came to light while filming, so the video was hurriedly changed into animation. The story remained as it was and the character design was also modeled on Sheena and Minagawa. Her pet cat "Goethe" also appears in the music video as a cyborg cat. The heroine was named  according to the anagram of the song title.

Track listing

Credits and personnel 
 Mayonaka wa Junketsu
 with 
 Trumpet: Nargo (Kimiyoshi Nagoya)
 Trombone: Masahiko Kitahara
 Alto Saxophone & Agitator: Tatsuyuki Hiyamuta
 Tenor Saxophone: Gamou
 Baritone Saxophone: Atsushi Yanaka
 Piano: Yuichi Oki
 Electric Bass: Tsuyoshi Kawakami
 Electric guitar: Takashi Kato
 Percussions: Hajime Ohmori
 Drums: Kin-ichi Motegi (from Fishmans, support member)
 Sido to Hakuchūmu
 with 
 Electric guitar: Jun Sumida
 Double bass: Benisuke Sakai
 Drums: Shuichi "Ponta" Murakami
 Electronic organ: Nobuo Kurata
 Trumpet: Eric Miyashiro, Shiro Sasaki, Yusuke Hayashi, Isao Sakuma
 Trombone: Eijoro Nakagawa, Osamu Matsumoto, Satoshi Sano
 Bass Trombone: Junko Yamashiro
 Alto Saxophone & flute: Bob Zung, Kazuhiko Kondo
 Tenor Saxophone: Osamu Koike, Osamu Yoshida
 Baritone Saxophone: Masakuni Takeno
 Harp: Yuko Taguchi
 Vibraphone & Glockenspiel: Hitoshi Hamada
 Aisaika no Chōshoku
 with 
 Piano & Programming: Toshiyuki Mori
 Contrabass: Hitoshi Watanabe
 Drums: Takashi Numazawa
 Accordion: coba Yasuhiro Kobayashi

References 

Ringo Sheena songs
2001 singles
Songs written by Ringo Sheena
2001 songs
EMI Music Japan singles
Animated music videos